Basse-Pointe is a town and commune in the French overseas department and region, and island of Martinique.

Geography

Climate
Basse-Pointe has a tropical rainforest climate (Köppen climate classification Af).

Population

See also
Communes of Martinique

References

External links

Communes of Martinique
Populated places in Martinique